Pelion railway is a  narrow gauge railway line of Thessaly Railways in Greece, connecting the city of Volos with the town of Mileai on Pelion.

History
After Thessaly Railways completed the construction of the  lines from Volos to Larissa and Kalampaka (1886) they decided to extend their network eastwards, to connect Volos with the communities of Pelion Peninsula. Due to limited space and mountainous terrain they decided to build this extension in  narrow gauge. The new line extended from Volos station through Volos city centre (as a tramway) to Agria (1892), reaching Ano Lechonia in 1896 and Mileai (Milies) in 1903.

The section from Volos station to Anavros is essentially a tramway. In addition to Pelion trains, tram services have operated in the past on this section. From Anavros to Agria and Lechonia the line has no special features, most notable being the concrete bridge over River Vrychon.

In contrast, the mountain section from Ano Lechonia to Mileai has a number of interesting civil engineering features, including seven stone bridges, an iron bridge at Milies, two tunnels and five stone road bridges over the line. Engine sheds were built at Volos, Agria and Mileai, but now the locomotives are maintained at a new shed at Ano Lechonia. Turntables were installed at Volos and Mileai, the latter being replaced recently with a new one of larger diameter to accommodate the diesel locomotives. Water towers were built at Agria, Ano Lechonia (still in use) and Mileai.

The line was operated by Thessaly Railways until 1955 and then taken over by the Hellenic State Railways. In 1971 it was transferred with the rest of the Greek railway lines to Hellenic Railways Organisation (OSE), which promptly suspended the service as a cost-saving measure.

The section from Volos to Agria was operated as a heritage railway by "The Friends of Pelion Railway" between 1987 and 1994, but OSE forced them to terminate the operation in order to preserve OSE's state-imposed monopoly. However, in 1996 OSE reopened the section from Ano Lechonia to Mileai as a heritage railway, initially using steam traction and converting to diesel traction in 1999. The stations of Ano Lechonia and Agria, which had been severely damaged by earthquakes, were restored according to the original designs.

Current services
Currently, Hellenic Train runs one train every Saturday, Sunday and public holiday from mid-April to the end of October. The train runs every day during July and August. According to the current timetable (May 2012), train 3800 departs Ano Lechnonia at 10:00 and arrives at Milies at 11:35. Return train 3801 departs Milies at 15:00 and arrives at Ano Lechnonia at 16:30.

Rolling stock

See also
 Thessaly Railways

References

External links and further reading

 
 
 
 
 
 Pelion railway at science.gr
 The Railways of Volos by James Waite (The International Steam pages, 2010).

Heritage railways of Greece
600 mm gauge railways in Greece
Rail transport in Thessaly
Thessaly Railways
Pelion